Mimosa salad is a festive salad whose main ingredients are cheese, eggs, canned fish, onion, and mayonnaise. Mimosa salad got its name because of its resemblance to mimosa flowers scattered on the snow. The similarity is achieved by crumbling and scattering boiled egg yolk on the surface. The salad's popularity in the USSR (and nowadays in the post-Soviet states) has led to the emergence of a wide variety of recipes.

Preparation
A classic recipe is to layer ingredients, in a bowl, with mayonnaise in between the layers. Typical ingredients include:
 Canned fish, drained, de-boned, mashed. Common sorts are salmon, pacific saury, mackerel, or trout;
 Hard cheese, finely crumbled, sprinkled;
 Boiled egg whites, coarsely grated, sprinkled. Sometimes the egg yolks, without the whites, are used. Sometimes entire hard boiled eggs are used.
 Boiled egg yolks, finely crumbled, sprinkled on top;
 Onion, finely chopped, sprinkled;
 Mayonnaise.

Further ingredients may include:
 Butter, coarsely grated, frozen, sprinkled;
 Boiled potatoes, coarsely grated, sprinkled;
 Boiled carrots, coarsely grated, sprinkled.

See also

 Eggs mimosa
 Egg salad
 Olivier salad
 Salade niçoise
 Dressed herring
 Tuna salad
 Zakuski
 List of salads
 List of Russian dishes
 List of fish dishes

References

External links

 Salat Mimosa - No Place Like Kitchen – Olga Galanter
 Salad Mimosa - cook step by step
 Mimosa salad recipe - RusCuisine.com
 Mimoza Salad (Serbian) - Tasty Makes Happy
 Mimosa salad - Azerbaijan Cookbook
 Mimosa salad - New Sweden Cultural Heritage Society
 Mimosa salad recipe – All recipes Australia NZ
 Mimosa salad Recipe - Genius cook
 Mrs. John F. Kennedy’s Salad Mimosa - Secrets from the White House Kitchens

 Crab and Avocado Mimosa – Mad Men Recipes: Food Republic

Fish salads
Soviet cuisine
Russian cuisine
Ukrainian cuisine
Egg dishes
Cheese dishes